Tishanka is a rural locality (a selo) and the administrative center of Tishanskoye Rural Settlement, Volokonovsky District, Belgorod Oblast, Russia. The population was 467 as of 2010. There are 4 streets.

Geography 
Tishanka is located 34 km southwest of Volokonovka (the district's administrative centre) by road. Novoye is the nearest rural locality.

References 

Rural localities in Volokonovsky District